Discosporangiales is an order of brown algae. It includes two families, Choristocarpaceae and Discosporangiaceae.

References

Brown algae
Brown algae orders